The Haunted Wagon Train is a BBC Books adventure book written by Colin Brake and is based on the long-running British science fiction television series Doctor Who.
It features the Tenth Doctor and Martha.

This is part of the Decide Your Destiny series which makes you choose what happens in the books.

Continuity
This book was originally scheduled to be followed by Frozen Earth, but that book was replaced by Lost Luggage.

Reception
As with Colin Brake's two previous Decide Your Destiny books (The Spaceship Graveyard and The Time Crocodile), The Haunted Wagon Train has received some negative reviews.

It was the final book in a second set of four, which were successful enough to allow the range to continue.

References

2007 British novels
2007 science fiction novels
Decide Your Destiny gamebooks
Tenth Doctor novels
Books by Colin Brake